Zvonko Buljan (born 6 February 1987) is a Croatian professional basketball power forward. A well traveled player, he has played in over ten countries, including in the Greek Basket League and the German Basketball Bundesliga. In 2014, he won both the Slovenian championship and the Slovenian Basketball Cup.

Playing career

College career
Buljan played college basketball for Vincennes University from 2006 to 2008. He then transferred to Texas Christian University where he played two seasons for the TCU Horned Frogs. In two seasons for the Horned Frogs, he averaged 12.2 points and 8.2 rebounds in 62 games.

Iceland
In September 2020, Buljan signed with Njarðvík of the Icelandic Úrvalsdeild karla. In his first game, on 3 October, he had 25 points and 11 rebounds in a 92–80 win against defending champions KR. Four days later, he was suspended for three games by the Icelandic Basketball Association for grabbing the genital area of an opposing player during the game. On 29 November 2020, Njarðvík announced that it had released Buljan on his own request due to the Coronavirus pandemic in Iceland. In January 2021, he signed with Úrvalsdeildar club ÍR. With ÍR, he averaged 19.4 points, 7.3 rebounds and 3.1 assists per game.

References

External links
 Profile at Eurobasket.com
 Profile at proballers.com
 TCU profile
 Icelandic statistics at Icelandic Basketball Association

1987 births
Living people
APOEL B.C. players
Basketball players from Split, Croatia
BC Körmend players
Croatian men's basketball players
Estudiantes Concordia basketball players
ÍR men's basketball players
KK Krka players
KK Split players
Kolossos Rodou B.C. players
Okapi Aalstar players
P.A.O.K. BC players
Power forwards (basketball)
Njarðvík men's basketball players
Telekom Baskets Bonn players
TCU Horned Frogs men's basketball players
Union Neuchâtel Basket players
Úrvalsdeild karla (basketball) players
Vincennes Trailblazers men's basketball players